The House Next Door may refer to:

The House Next Door (Big Brother), a series of rooms connected to the 2006 Big Brother House for the UK television series
The House Next Door (2006 film), a made-for-television movie produced by the Lifetime Network
The House Next Door (2017 film), an Indian trilingual film
The House Next Door: Meet the Blacks 2, an upcoming American comedy horror film
The House Next Door (novel), 1976 novel by Anne Rivers Siddons
The House Next Door (short story collection), a 2019 book of three stories by James Patterson and three lesser known authors
The House Next Door (telenovela), a 2011 Telemundo telenovela
The House Next Door, the official blog of Slant magazine, which is "home" to columns about media, the arts and current events
Die Von Hochsatte (or The House Next Door), an early 20th Century theatre production written by Leo Stein